Adiel Kugotsi (born 3 October 1984) is a former Zimbabwean cricketer. A right-handed batsman and right-arm medium-fast bowler, he played six first-class matches for Manicaland between 2002 and 2004.

References

External links
 
 

1984 births
Living people
Cricketers from Mutare
Manicaland cricketers
Zimbabwean cricketers